The 1999–2000 Syracuse Orangemen basketball team represented Syracuse University during the 1999–2000 NCAA men's basketball season. The head coach was Jim Boeheim, serving for his 24th year. The team played its home games at the Carrier Dome in Syracuse, New York.  The team finished with a 26–6 (13–3 Big East) record, while making it to the Sweet Sixteen of the NCAA tournament.

Roster

Schedule and results

|-
!colspan=9 style=| Regular season

|-
!colspan=9 style=| Big East Tournament

|-
!colspan=9 style=| NCAA Tournament

Rankings

References

Syracuse Orange men's basketball seasons
Syracuse
Syracuse
Syracuse Orange men's b
Syracuse Orange men's b